The following is a list of notable British Pakistanis, namely notable citizens or residents of the United Kingdom whose ethnic origins lie in Pakistan:

Academia and education

Humanities 
 Sara Ahmed – professor of Race and Cultural Studies at Goldsmiths, University of London and academic working at the intersection of feminist theory, queer theory, critical race theory and postcolonialism
 Shabbir Akhtar – philosopher
 Tariq Ali – academic, historian and novelist
 Khizar Humayun Ansari OBE – director of the Centre for Minority Studies at the University of London, known for his work in the field of race and ethnic relations
 Sarah Ansari – professor of history at Royal Holloway, University of London
 Akil Awan – British academic and the current RCUK Fellow at the Royal Holloway, University of London
 Yasmin Khan – historian of British India and associate professor of history at the University of Oxford
 Ziauddin Sardar – scholar, writer and cultural critic
 Mona Siddiqui – professor of Islamic Studies and Public Understanding at the University of Glasgow, as well a regular contributor to BBC Radio 4's The Moral Maze, The Times, The Scotsman, The Guardian and The Herald

Natural sciences
 Haroon Ahmed – professor emeritus of Microelectronics at the Cavendish Laboratory, the Physics Department of the University of Cambridge
 Saiful Islam – professor of Materials Chemistry at the University of Bath and a recipient of the Royal Society Wolfson Research Merit award
 Syma Khalid – biophysicist who is a professor of Computational Biophysics in Chemistry at the University of Southampton.
 Ehsan Masood – science writer, journalist and broadcaster; editor of Research Fortnight and Research Europe; teaches International Science Policy at Imperial College London
 Azra Meadows OBE – honorary lecturer in the Institute of Biomedical and Life Sciences at the University of Glasgow
 Jawed Siddiqi – professor emeritus of software engineering at Sheffield Hallam University and political activist
 Ghayasuddin Siddiqui – academic and political activist

Social sciences
 Hamza Alavi – Marxist academic sociologist and activist
 Muhammad Anwar – University of Warwick sociologist
 Tariq Modood – professor of sociology, politics and public policy at the University of Bristol

University leadership and executives
 Nazir Afzal – Former Chief Crown Prosecutor for North West England; Chancellor of the University of Manchester, began his term in 2022 as the highest ranked Pashtun at any Russell Group institution 
 Aneez Esmail – Retired Associate Vice-president at the University of Manchester; formerly based at Institute of Population Health belonging to the Faculty of Medical and Human Sciences; held a visiting professorship at Harvard University in the US
 Sayeeda Warsi – former Conservative Party chairman and now Deputy-Chancellor of the University of Bolton

Business and finance

FTSE 100 and multinational corporations
 Javed Ahmed – former Chief Executive of Tate & Lyle PLC from 2009 to 2018, a FTSE 100 company which is one of Britain's oldest brands
 Mohammed Amin MBE – retired partner at PricewaterhouseCoopers UK; Chairman of the Conservative Muslim Forum, Amin joined the Liberal Democrats after the promotion of Boris Johnson
Salman Amin – chief executive officer of Pladis; group owner of Godiva premium chocolate and McVities biscuits
 Zameer Choudrey – Chief Executive of Bestway Group; second richest Pakistani and the largest family-owned business in the United Kingdom
 Naguib Kheraj – Vice-chairman of Barclays Bank PLC; former boss of JP Morgan Cazenove; his philanthropic interests have made him Chairman of the Aga Khan Foundation based in Karachi Pakistan
 Sir Anwar Pervez OBE – Rawalpindi-born businessman founder of the Bestway Group; one of the largest financial backers to the UK Conservative Party; lives in Beaconsfield, Buckinghamshire

Small and medium-sized enterprises
 Mumtaz Khan Akbar – founder and owner of the Mumtaz brand
 Amjad Ali – co-founder of fast food chain Dixy Chicken
 Ruzwana Bashir – British businesswoman, former Oxford Union President and founder and CEO of Peek.com, travel company based in San Francisco, California
 James Caan – businessman and entrepreneur; formerly a part of Dragons' Den
 Mo Chaudry – born in Pakistan, raised in England; became a millionaire businessman in the West Midlands
 Humayon Dar – advocate of Islamic banking and finance; founder of the Global Islamic Finance Awards
 Afzal Kahn – Bradford-based entrepreneur, owns a specialist car design company; in 2008 he broke records by paying £440,000 for a distinctive 'F1' number plate; has previously shown an interest in purchasing Newcastle football club
 Mohammed Khalid – founder and Chairman of the successful fast food chain Chicken Cottage
 Zarine Kharas – co-founder and CEO of JustGiving
 Abid Mehmood – co-founder of fast food chain Dixy Chicken
 Amar Latif – Scottish entrepreneur, television personality and professional traveller
 Tahir Mohsan – founder of Time Computers, Supanet, and Tpad; currently manages several investment companies from his base in Dubai
 Aneel Mussarat – property millionaire; his company, MCR Property Group, specialises in renting apartments to university students in Manchester and Liverpool
 Tarak Ramzan – founder and CEO of the Quiz womenswear retail chain
 Asim Siddiqui – chairman and a founding trustee of The City Circle
 Adeem Younis - founder and CEO of SingleMuslim.com and Penny Appeal

Entertainment
 Abdullah Afzal – actor and stand-up comedian
 Shehzad Afzal – writer, director, producer and game designer; born in Dundee, Scotland
 Riz Ahmed – British actor, best known for his role in films such as Four Lions, Nightcrawler, Rogue One, and Venom, as well as in the HBO miniseries The Night Of
 Hajaz Akram – British Pakistani actor
 Mina Anwar – British actress, best known for playing Police Constable Maggie Habib in the sitcom The Thin Blue Line
 Humza Arshad – actor and comedian; the producer of the YouTube series Diary of a Bad Man
 Sadia Azmat – stand-up comedian
 Shabana Bakhsh – actress who has appeared in soaps such as River City and Doctors
 Babar Bhatti – actor known for the part of Punkah Wallah Rumzan in the BBC sitcom It Ain't Half Hot Mum
 Jamil Dehlavi – London-based independent film director and producer of Pakistani-French origin
 Dynamo – born Steven Frayne; popular magician; Pakistani father and English mother
 Tan France – fashion designer, television personality, and author He is currently the fashion expert for the Netflix series Queer Eye.
 Ahmad Hussain – singer-songwriter, executive, producer and founder and managing director of IQRA Promotions
 Aziz Ibrahim – musician best known for his work as guitarist with Simply Red, The Stone Roses (post-John Squire)
 Naz Ikramullah – British-Canadian artist and film producer; of Pakistani origin
 Tez Ilyas – stand-up comedian of Pakistani descent
 Jameela Jamil – actress, radio presenter and activist
 Sarah Joyce – better known by her stage name, 'Rumer'; Pakistani-born British singer–songwriter
 Annie Khalid – English-Pakistani musician and model
 Abid Khan – director 
 Ahsan Khan – film and television actor, host and performer
 Alyy Khan – film and television actor and host
 Aqib Khan – actor who played Sajid Khan in the movie West is West
 Armeena Rana Khan – Canadian born Pakistani-British film and television actress and model, known for her work in the Pakistani entertainment industry
 Guz Khan – comedian and actor
 Natasha Khan – known by her stage name, 'Bat for Lashes'; half Pakistani half English singer-songwriter and multi-instrumentalist
 Sair Khan – Coronation Street actress of Pakistani descent
 Saira Khan – runner-up on the first series of The Apprentice; TV presenter on BBC's Temper Your Temper and Desi DNA
 Shahid Khan – known as 'Naughty Boy'; British-born Pakistani songwriter, record producer and musician
 Ayub Khan Din – actor and playwright, known for writing the film East Is East
 Zack Knight – Punjabi singer, songwriter and performer
 Mani Liaqat – Manchester-based British Asian actor and comedian
 Art Malik – Pakistani-born British actor who achieved international fame in the 1980s through his starring and subsidiary roles in assorted British and Merchant-Ivory television serials and films
 Zayn Malik – former member of the British-Irish boyband One Direction from Bradford, whose father is from Pakistan; his mother is mixed British and Irish
 Nadia Manzoor – writer, performer, and producer based in Brooklyn, New York.
 Jeff Mirza – stand-up comedian and actor
 Shazia Mirza – comedian from Birmingham, England, whose act revolves around her Muslim faith
 Suleman Mirza – lead dancer of dance group Signature; runner-up on Britain's Got Talent 2008
 Zia Mohyeddin – Pakistani actor, narrator, producer, director and television broadcaster who has appeared in both Pakistani and British cinema throughout his career
 Mazhar Munir – television and film actor; before co-starring in the 2005 movie Syriana, he appeared in three British television shows: The Bill, Mile High, and Doctors
 Murtz – television and radio presenter
 Aki Nawaz – British singer and musician; part of the band Fun-Da-Mental 
 Adil Omar – British-born Pakistani recording artist
 Adil Ray – presenter, better known as the creator of BBC South Asian Muslim comedy Citizen Khan in which he also portrays the protagonist
 Sakina Samo – award-winning actress, producer and director
 Kiran Sonia Sawar – Scottish actress best known for her role in the one-off drama Murdered by My Father
 Nadine Shah – singer-songwriter and musician
 Jay Shareef – award-winning stand-up comedian and broadcaster
 Rani Taj – dhol player dubbed 'Dhol Queen' after her YouTube video went viral
 Badi Uzzaman – television and film actor
 Atta Yaqub – actor and model
 Mikaal Zulfiqar – British born Pakistani actor and model
 Mawaan Rizwan - British actor, writer and comedian
 Asim Chaudhry - British comedian, writer, director and actor

Journalism and media
 Ali Abbasi – former Scottish TV presenter
 Kamran Abbasi – doctor, medical editor, and cricket writer; currently editor of the Journal of the Royal Society of Medicine; former acting editor of British Medical Journal and editor of the bulletin of the World Health Organization
 Asad Ahmad – BBC journalist and news presenter
 Arif Ali – regional product director for the Associated Press news agency in Europe, Middle East and Africa
 Yasmin Alibhai-Brown – journalist and author born in Uganda, currently columnist for The Independent and the Evening Standard
 Shaista Aziz – journalist, writer, stand-up comedian, and former international aid worker
 Anila Baig – columnist at The Sun
 Martin Bashir – British journalist of Pakistani descent, currently with ABC's 20/20
 Hassan Ghani – Scottish broadcast journalist and documentary filmmaker, based in London
 Mishal Husain – anchor for BBC World
 Faris Kermani – film director based in the UK, now head of Crescent Films, production company based in London
 Reham Khan – journalist and anchor currently working at Dawn News
 Rizwan Khan – works for Al Jazeera English; has his own show called Riz Khan
 Mazher Mahmood (also known as the Fake Sheikh) – often dubbed as "Britain's most notorious undercover reporter"; in a GQ survey was voted as the 45th most powerful man in Britain, ahead of Prince William; the News of the World paid his six-figure salary
 Javed Malik – television anchor; publisher of the UAE's first diplomatic magazine, The International Diplomat; executive director of the World Forum; served as Pakistan's Ambassador at Large and Special Advisor to the Prime Minister
 Sarfraz Manzoor – Pakistani-born British writer, journalist, documentary maker, and broadcaster; writes regularly for The Guardian; presents documentaries on BBC Radio 4
 Aasmah Mir – BBC presenter and former columnist for the Sunday Herald
 Nazia Mogra – television journalist for BBC North West Tonight News on BBC One
 Jason Mohammad – radio and television presenter
 Saima Mohsin – British journalist
 Shereen Nanjiani – radio journalist with BBC Radio Scotland
 Adnan Nawaz – news and sports presenter working for the BBC World Service
 Zarqa Nawaz – freelance writer, journalist, broadcaster, and filmmaker
 Asad Qureshi – filmmaker who was kidnapped on 26 March 2010 by a militant group called the "Asian Tigers" in Pakistan's Federally Administered Tribal Areas
 Osama Saeed – head of International and Media Relations at the Al Jazeera Media Network

Law and justice
 Nazir Afzal – Chief Crown Prosecutor for North West England, who initiated prosecutions in the case of the Rochdale sex trafficking gang
 Aamer Anwar – Glaswegian solicitor; named as Criminal Lawyer of the Year by the Law Awards of Scotland in 2005 and 2006
Tan Ikram – Deputy Senior District Judge (MC) of England & Wales based at Westminster Magistrates' Court; Associate Judge, SBA, Cyprus; holds honorary doctorates in laws (LLD) from the University of West London and the University of Wolverhampton; Contributing Editor, Archbold Magistrates Criminal Courts Practice 2020
 Javed Khan – Chief Executive of Barnardo's, former Chief Executive of the British charity Victim Support; of Kashmiri origin; member of the Whitehall Social Policy Forum; an adviser to the Goldman Sachs Global Leaders Programme
 Karim Ahmad Khan – lawyer and chief International Criminal Court prosecutor
 Khawar Qureshi QC – barrister and international lawyer.

Architecture
Saira Hussain – Lancashire-based and Huddersfield University educated; named most influential woman in UK Architecture 2017

Literature and art
 Tariq Ali – historian and novelist
 Moniza Alvi – poet and writer
 Rasheed Araeen – London-based conceptual artist, sculptor, painter, writer, and curator
 Nadeem Aslam – novelist
 Nasser Azam – contemporary artist, living and working in London
 Shezad Dawood – artist based in London
 Imtiaz Dharker – poet and documentary filmmaker
 Roopa Farooki – novelist born in Lahore, Pakistan,
 Mohsin Hamid – Pakistani writer of novels Moth Smoke (2000), The Reluctant Fundamentalist (2007), and How to Get Filthy Rich in Rising Asia (2013)
 Aamer Hussein – short story writer and critic
 Zahid Hussain – novelist, poet and screenwriter
 Razia Iqbal – arts correspondent for the BBC; born in East Africa and is of Muslim Punjabi origin
 Idris Khan – artist based in London
 Shamshad Khan – Manchester-based poet born in Leeds; worked as an editor on an anthology of black women's poetry and advised the Arts Council of England North West
 Vaseem Khan – writer, author of the Baby Ganesh Detective Agency novels
 Hanif Kureishi – playwright, screenwriter and filmmaker, novelist and short story writer
 Omar Mansoor – London-based fashion designer, best known for his couture occasionwear
 Emran Mian – author and policy advisor at Whitehall
 Suhayl Saadi – literary and erotic novelist; radio and stage playwright
 Ziauddin Sardar – scholar, writer and cultural critic
 Qaisra Shahraz – novelist, journalist, Fellow of the Royal Society of Arts and a director of Gatehouse Books
 Anwar Sheikh – Pakistani-born British author; lives in Cardiff, Wales

Civil service, military and police
 Tarique Ghaffur – high-ranking British police officer in London's Metropolitan Police Service; Assistant Commissioner–Central Operations
 Jabron Hashmi – soldier killed in action in Sangin, Afghanistan, in 2006
 Amjad Hussain – senior Royal Navy officer; highest-ranking member of the British Armed Forces from an ethnic minority
 Sajid Javid – Rochdale-born; former Home Secretary; included in The Times  list of "Top 100 Global People to Watch in 2012", and in The Daily Telegraphs list of "Top 100 most influential figures from the Right" 
 Muhammed Akbar Khan – British recruit in the First World War and an officer in the Second World War; first Muslim to become a general in the British Army
 Emran Mian – previously lived in Islamabad; later completed his PhD at Corpus Christi College, Cambridge; Policy Advisor at Whitehall and the Cabinet Office; won a 2014 UK Civil Servant of the Year Award

Politics

Members of Parliament
 Imran Ahmad Khan – former Conservative Party Member of Parliament (MP) for Wakefield, president of the Transnational Crisis Project; expert on transnational security
 Tasmina Ahmed-Sheikh – former Scottish National Party MP for Ochil and South Perthshire
 Tahir Ali – MP representing Birmingham Hall Green for the Labour Party
 Rosena Allin-Khan – Labour MP for Tooting
 Saqib Bhatti – Conservative MP for Meriden, first elected in the 2019 United Kingdom general election.
 Rehman Chishti – Conservative MP for Gillingham and Rainham
 Nus Ghani – Conservative MP for Wealden
 Imran Hussain – Labour MP for Bradford East and Shadow Minister for International Development
 Sajid Javid – Conservative MP for Bromsgrove
 Afzal Khan – Labour MP for Manchester Gorton solicitor and former Labour MEP for North West region; first Asian Lord Mayor of Manchester; 
 Sadiq Khan – Mayor of London, former Labour MP for Tooting and Shadow Secretary of State for Justice and Shadow Lord Chancellor
 Khalid Mahmood – Labour MP for Birmingham Perry Barr
 Shabana Mahmood – Labour MP For Birmingham Ladywood
 Shahid Malik – former Labour MP for Dewsbury; served as a Minister for International Development in Gordon Brown's government
 Anum Qaisar-Javed – Scottish National Party MP for Airdrie and Shotts  
 Yasmin Qureshi – Labour MP for Bolton South East
 Faisal Rashid – former Labour MP for Warrington South, elected in 2017. He was the Mayor of Warrington in 2016.
 Naz Shah – Labour MP for the constituency of Bradford West
 Zarah Sultana – Labour Party MP for Coventry South
 Mohammad Yasin – Labour MP for Bedford, elected in 2017

Peers
 Tariq Ahmad, Baron Ahmad – Conservative Baron of Wimbledon
 Nazir Ahmed, Baron Ahmed – Unaffiliated peer in the House of Lords, formerly Labour now retired.
 Zameer Choudrey, Baron Choudrey CBE  Conservative life peer, businessman 
Kishwer Falkner, Baroness Falkner of Margravine – Lead Liberal Democrat Spokesperson for Foreign Affairs in the House of Lords 
Shaista Gohir, Baroness Gohir OBE - Crossbench life peer
Wajid Khan, Baron Khan – Labour Baron of Burnley
 Zahida Manzoor, Baroness Manzoor – Liberal Democrat Baroness; former Legal Services Ombudsman; former Deputy Chair of the Commission for Racial Equality
 Nosheena Mobarik, Baroness Mobarik – Conservative Baroness of Mearns in the County of Renfrewshire; former Chairman of CBI Scotland
 Michael Nazir-Ali – now retired Bishop in the House of Lords
 Qurban, Lord Hussain – Life peer
 Aamer Sarfraz, Baron Sarfraz – former Conservative party treasurer
 Shas Sheehan, Baroness Sheehan – Liberal Democrat and Baroness of Wimbledon in the London Borough of Merton and of Tooting in the London Borough of Wandsworth
 Mohamed Sheikh, Baron Sheikh – Baron of Cornhill and Chairman of Conservative Muslim Forum
 Sayeeda Hussain, Baroness Warsi – Conservative minister without portfolio and a former member of the Cabinet,

Members of Scottish Parliament
 Bashir Ahmad – former SNP Member of the Scottish Parliament
 Hanzala Malik – Scottish Labour Party member of the Scottish Parliament for Glasgow, elected in 2011
 Anas Sarwar – Leader of the Scottish Labour Party and Labour MSP for the Glasgow region
 Kaukab Stewart – SNP MSP for Glasgow Kelvin.
 Humza Yousaf – SNP MSP for Glasgow Pollok, Cabinet Secretary for Health and Social Care and former Justice Secretary (2018 to 2021)

Members of the Senedd
 Mohammad Asghar – Welsh politician, representing Plaid Cymru and Welsh Conservatives. First ethnic minority member elected to the Senedd
 Natasha Asghar – Welsh politician, representing the Welsh Conservatives.  First female ethnic minority member elected to the Senedd

Members of the London Assembly
 Hina Bokhari – Liberal Democrat AM
 Sakina Sheikh – Labour AM

Mayors
Munir Ahmed – Mayor of the London Borough of Ealing 2021-22 
 Shiraz Mirza – Honorary Alderman and First Asian Mayor of the Royal Borough of Kingston upon Thames in 2000 and again in 2007. Shiraz Mirza also served as the Assistant Police and Crime Commissioner for Surrey Police.
 Rokhsana Fiaz – Labour Party politician serving as Mayor of Newham
 Sadiq Khan – elected Mayor of London in May 2016
 Chauhdry Abdul Rashid – former Lord Mayor of Birmingham

Others in politics
 Amjad Bashir – former Conservative Member of the European Parliament (MEP) for Yorkshire and the Humber; former UKIP Small & Medium Business spokesman
 Benyamin Habib – Brexit Party MEP for London from 2019 to 2020.
 Sajjad Karim – former Conservative MEP; born in Brierfield, Lancashire; qualified as a solicitor and started a number of successful lawyers' practices before being elected as a Member of the European Parliament in 2007; Conservative Legal Affairs Spokesman; sits on the Industry, Research and Energy Committee
 Bashir Khanbhai – former Conservative MEP for East of England
 Shaffaq Mohammed – Liberal Democrats Member of the European Parliament (MEP) for Yorkshire and the Humber from 2019 to 2020.
 Mushtaq Ahmad – Lord Lieutenant of Lanarkshire. He was the first Asian to serve as Provost of a Scottish council
 Shahnaz Ali –  British Muslim woman best known for her leadership role in equality, inclusion and human rights in the National Health Service and local government in England
 Bashir Maan – Pakistani-Scottish politician, businessman and writer
 Munira Mirza – was the Deputy Mayor for Education and Culture of London. Born in Oldham.
 Salma Yaqoob – vice-chair of the Respect Party; Birmingham City Councillor
Zulfi Bukhari – Minister of State for Overseas Pakistanis & Human Resource Development and Special Assistant to Prime Minister Imran Khan.

International governmental organizations
Aga Khan III – Karachi-born and Cambridge University educated. Khan III served as the President of the League of Nations from 1937 to 1938.

Religion
 Michael Nazir-Ali – 106th Bishop of Rochester in the Church of England; holds dual Pakistani and British citizenship. Became Roman Catholic in 2021.
 Musharraf Hussain – scientist, educator and religious scholar in Nottinghamshire
 Faiz-ul-Aqtab Siddiqi – scholar and principal of the Hijaz College
 Saleem Sidwai – accountant and Secretary General of the Muslim Council of Wales

Militants
 Hasib Hussain – 7/7 bomber
Junaid Hussain – ISIS terrorist
 Mohammad Sidique Khan – oldest of the four homegrown suicide bombers and believed to be the leader responsible for the 7 July 2005 London bombings
 Abu Bakr Mansha – convicted under the Terrorism Act 2000
 Shehzad Tanweer – 7/7 bomber
Usman Khan – London knife attacker

Science and medicine
 Haroon Ahmed – prominent scientist in the fields of microelectronics and electrical engineering
 Qanta Ahmed – physician specializing in sleep disorders. She is also an author and a newspaper columnist
 Rozina Ali – microvascular reconstructive plastic surgeon and consultant with a specialist interest in breast reconstruction; television presenter
 Nadia Bukhari – pharmacist and youngest female fellow of the Royal Pharmaceutical Society; an honour bestowed to those who have achieved excellence and distinction in their pharmacy career.
 Hasnat Khan – heart and lung surgeon who was romantically involved with Diana, Princess of Wales
 Mohammad Naseem – qualified GP and the chairman of the Birmingham Mosque Trust
 Asim Shahmalak – hair transplant surgeon and broadcaster, and proponent of such surgery; in 2009, he performed the UK's first eyelash transplant

Sport

Boxing
 Tanveer Ahmed – former lightweight boxer; WBO Inter-Continental champion
 Ijaz Ahmed – British super-flyweight boxer
 Muhammad Ali – featherweight boxer; amateur champion
 Kyle Yousaf – British flyweight boxer; held the English flyweight title in 2018
 Hamzah Sheeraz – British light-middleweight boxer, WBO European title champion
 Kash Ali – British heavyweight boxer, holds the IBF European heavyweight title
 Ukashir Farooq – British bantamweight boxer, former British bantamweight title winner
 Usman Ahmed – super flyweight boxer
 Adnan Amar – British light-middleweight boxer, multiple title winner
 Adil Anwar – British light-welterweight boxer and multiple title winner
 Qais Ashfaq – British super-bantamweight boxer; Commonwealth silver medallist and WBA Continental title holder
 Jawaid Khaliq, MBE – first British Asian to win a world title belt
 Amer Khan – former undefeated light-heavyweight boxer, Central Area championship winner
 Amir Khan – British light-welterweight boxer; 2004 Olympics silver medalist; former world champion
 Haroon Khan – super-flyweight boxer and commonwealth bronze-medalist 
 Nadeem Siddique – former British welterweight boxer, multiple title winner
 Adam Azim - professional boxer

Cricket
 Aquib Afzaal – left-handed batsman who bowls right-arm off break
 Kamran Afzaal – Pakistani-born English cricketer; right-handed batsman
 Usman Afzaal – cricketer who has played three Test matches for England
 Ajaz Akhtar – former Pakistani people-born English cricketer
 Mohammad Akhtar – Pakistani-born English cricketer; right-handed batsman who bowls right-arm off break
 Kabir Ali – English cricketer; formerly played for Worcestershire
 Kadeer Ali – cricketer formerly playing for Worcestershire and is related to Kabir Ali
 Moeen Ali – test cricketer playing for England and Worcestershire County Cricket Club
 Rehan Alikhan – English-born former cricketer of Pakistani descent; right-handed batsman and off-break bowler
 Akbar Ansari – English first class and List A cricketer who played his first class games for Cambridge University Cricket Club and Cambridge University Centre of Cricketing Excellence and List A cricket for Marylebone Cricket Club
 Zafar Ansari – English cricketer who plays for Cambridge University and Surrey County Cricket Club
 Imran Arif – Pakistani-born English cricketer; a fast-medium bowler; currently plays for Worcestershire County Cricket Club
 Asim Butt – Scottish and Pakistani cricketer; primarily a left-arm medium fast bowler
 Aamir Farooque – former Pakistani-born English cricketer
 Majid Haq – Scottish cricket player
 Omer Hussain – left-handed batsman; cousin of fellow Scottish international cricketer Majid Haq
 Moneeb Iqbal – Scottish cricketer; right-handed batsman and leg-break bowler
 Shammi Iqbal – English cricketer; right-handed batsman who bowls right-arm medium pace
 Imran Jamshed – former Pakistani-born English cricketer; right-handed batsman who bowled right-arm medium pace 
 Shaftab Khalid – English cricketer, a right-arm off-spinner who also bats right-handed
 Aamer Khan – Pakistani-born former English cricketer
 Amjad Khan – former cricketer for England International and the youngest to play for the Danish national team
 Rawait Khan – former English cricketer who played for Derbyshire County Cricket Club and Pakistan Customs in a four-year first-class career which saw him bowl mostly in Second XI Championship matches
 Wasim Khan MBE – first British-born Pakistani to play professional cricket in England; talented left-handed batsman who also bowled right arm medium pace; now chief executive of Leicestershire County Cricket Club
 Sajid Mahmood – cricketer who formerly played international cricket for England and county cricket for Essex and Lancashire County Cricket Club
 Nadeem Malik – English cricketer, a right-arm fast-medium seam bowler and right-handed lower-order batsman
 Maneer Mirza – English cricketer; right-arm fast-medium bowler and right-handed batsman who played for Worcestershire
 Imraan Mohammad – English cricketer; right-handed batsman who bowls right-arm off break
 Waqar Mohammad – former Pakistani-born English cricketer; right-handed batsman who bowled leg break
 Saleem Mohammed – former English cricketer; right-handed batsman
 Azeem Rafiq – English cricketer
 Adil Rashid – English cricketer who plays for Yorkshire and England Under-19s
 Hamza Riazuddin – English cricketer; right-handed lower-order batsman and a right-arm medium-fast bowler who currently plays for Hampshire
 Naheem Sajjad – Pakistani-born English cricketer; right-handed batsman who bowls left-arm fast-medium
 Bilal Shafayat – cricketer
 Rashid Shafayat – former English cricketer
 Owais Shah – former Middlesex, Essex and Hampshire cricketer who also appeared for England in a number of One Day Internationals and two Test matches
 Nadeem Shahid – former English first-class cricketer who played for Essex and Surrey
 Ajmal Shahzad – cricketer who plays for Nottinghamshire County Cricket Club and formerly represented England in all three formats of the game
 Safyaan Sharif – right-arm fast-medium bowler and a right-handed batsman
 Zoheb Sharif – left-handed batsman and a leg-break bowler
 Qasim Sheikh – Scottish cricketer; has represented Scotland on more than 20 occasions
 Alamgir Sheriyar – former Leicestershire cricketer
 Naqaash Tahir – English cricketer; right-arm fast-medium bowler who has played for Lancashire and Warwickshire
 Rehan Ahmed - English cricketer; youngest test debutant for England
 Abtaha Maqsood - Scottish cricketer; first hijab-wearing cricketer, plays for Sunrisers, Birmingham Phoenix and Scotland

Football

 Adnan Ahmed – Tranmere Rovers
 Iltaf Ahmed – goalkeeper of the Pakistan national football team
 Reis Ashraf – plays for Buckingham Town in the United Counties League Division One
 Atif Bashir – (British Pakistani father and Turkish German mother)
 Adam Docker – Porthmadog F.C.
 Abbas Farid – freestyle footballer from Newport, South Wales;
 Usman Gondal – Pakistani international
 Amjad Iqbal – Farsley Celtic F.C.
 Zidane Iqbal – professional footballer who plays as a midfielder for Manchester United U23
 Omar Kader – midfielder for Arbroath
 Otis Khan – footballer who plays as a midfielder for Matlock Town on loan from Sheffield United
 Shabir Khan – plays for Worcester City, having progressed through their youth system
 Adil Nabi – forward for West Bromwich Albion
 Zeeshan Rehman – defender for Queens Park Rangers; first Pakistani and British Asian to play in the Premiership with Fulham
 Rashid Sarwar – Kilmarnock
 Kashif Siddiqi – Pakistani international
 Easah Suliman – Aston Villa; has represented England at youth level, first player of Asian heritage to captain an England representative side, having done so at Under-16, Under-17 and Under-19 levels.
 Nadia Khan - forward for Doncaster Rovers Belles and the Pakistan National Team
 Shadab Iftikhar - football manager; first British Asian to manage a Scottish senior team.

Martial arts
 Qasim Beg – undefeated kickboxing champion, two-time world champion
 Imran Khan – two-time World Muay Thai champion 
 Nisar Smiler – two-time karate world champion and fifty-time gold medalist

Other sports
 Enaam Ahmed – Indy NXT driver and British F3 champion, series' youngest-ever champion at just 17 years old
 Shokat Ali – English snooker player of Pakistani descent; represents Pakistan in international tournaments
Ikram Butt – former professional rugby league footballer; first south Asian to play either code of international rugby for England in 1995; founder of the British Asian Rugby Association and the British Pakistani rugby league team
Gaz Choudhry – wheelchair basketball player; played for Paralympics GB in the 2012 Summer Paralympics in London
Aamir Ghaffar – English badminton player
Adam Khan – racing driver from Bridlington, Yorkshire; represents Pakistan in the A1 Grand Prix series; currently demonstration driver for the Renault F1 racing team
Carla Khan – British-born squash player; granddaughter of squash legend Azam Khan
Hiddy Jahan – squash player who was ranked among the top-6 players in the world from 1970 through to 1986
Alessandro Latif – race car driver
Zia Mahmood – Pakistani professional bridge player; a World Bridge Federation and American Contract Bridge League Grand Life Master
Imran Majid – professional British pool player
Imran Sherwani – former English field hockey player; was capped 45 times for Great Britain and 49 times for England
Lianna Swan – swimmer, represented Pakistan in the 2014 Commonwealth Games
Matthew Syed – table tennis international player; the English number one for many years

Other
 Aliza Ayaz – youth climate activist
 Mazhar Majeed – sporting agent and bookmaker who came under police investigation in 2010 following reports of cricket 'match fixing' after a News of the World sting operation
 Omar Mansoor – fashion designer who showcased at the London Fashion Week in 2008
 Robina Qureshi – Scottish human rights campaigner
 Dina Wadia – daughter of Muhammad Ali Jinnah and Rattanbai Jinnah

See also
 British Pakistani
 Overseas Pakistani
 List of Pakistani Americans
 List of Pakistani Canadians
 List of Pakistani Australians

References

P
Pakistanis
 
Pakistani diaspora in the United Kingdom
Britain